Stephen A. Satterfield (born April 18, 1985) is an African-American food writer, producer, and media entrepreneur. He is the television host of 2021 Netflix docu-series High on the Hog How African American Cuisine Transformed America.

Biography

Early life
Satterfield was born April 18, 1985, at Crawford Long Hospital in Atlanta, Georgia to parents Sam and Debbie Satterfield. His family lived in Stone Mountain, Georgia and Decatur, Georgia during his childhood. He graduated from Holy Innocents’ Episcopal School in Sandy Springs, Georgia in 2002.

Career
After attending the University of Oregon for one year, Satterfield attended culinary school at the Western Culinary Institute in Portland, Oregon. He became a sommelier by age 21.

In 2007, he founded the International Society of Africans in Wine, a non-profit foundation to support Black winemakers in Africa. He moved to San Francisco in 2010 and became manager of the farm-to-table restaurant Nopa. In 2016, he cofounded  Whetstone, a quarterly magazine exploring food history and culture. In 2018, he founded Whetstone Media. The company partnered with iHeartRadio to launch the food anthropology podcast Point of Origin as an audio adaptation of the magazine.

Satterfield was the host of the Netflix docu-series High on the Hog: How African American Cuisine Transformed America released in May 2021.

Philosophical views
Satterfield endeavors to consider food holistically as a means of connecting to the human experience and better understanding the world. He works to bring diverse viewpoints to food writing.

Honors and awards
Satterfield was selected as a 2016 Food Writing Fellow by The Culinary Trust and assigned to work on the website Civil Eats.

References

External links
 
 Whetstone magazine

Living people
1985 births
People from Atlanta
American food writers
Sommeliers
Netflix people